Detour is a 1945 American independent film noir directed by Edgar G. Ulmer starring Tom Neal and Ann Savage. The screenplay was adapted by Martin Goldsmith and Martin Mooney (uncredited) from Goldsmith's 1939 novel of the same title, and released by the Producers Releasing Corporation, one of the so-called Poverty Row film studios in mid-20th-century Hollywood.

In 1992, Detour was selected for the United States National Film Registry by the Library of Congress as being "culturally, historically, or aesthetically significant".

The film, which today is in the public domain and freely available for viewing at various online sources, was restored by the Academy Film Archive in 2018. In April that year, the 4K restoration premiered in Los Angeles at the TCM Festival. A Blu-Ray and DVD was released in March 2019 from the Criterion Collection.

Plot
Al Roberts, an unemployed piano player, is hitchhiking. After getting a ride, he arrives at a roadside diner in Reno, Nevada. Another customer in the diner plays a song on the jukebox, one that disturbs Al, for it reminds him of his former life in New York City. He remembers a time there when he was bitter about squandering his musical talent working in a cheap nightclub. After his girlfriend Sue Harvey, the nightclub's lead singer, quit her job and left to seek fame in Hollywood, he became depressed. After some anguish, Al decided to travel to California to see Sue and marry her. With little money, though, he was forced to hitchhike his way across the country.

In Arizona, bookie Charles Haskell Jr. gives Al a ride in his convertible and tells him that he is in luck; he is driving to Los Angeles to place a bet on a horse. During the drive, he has Al pass him pills on several occasions, which he swallows as he drives. That night, Al drives while Haskell sleeps. When a rainstorm forces Al to pull over to put up the convertible's top, he is unable to rouse Haskell. Al opens the passenger-side door and Haskell tumbles out, falling to the ground and striking his head on a rock. Al then realizes the bookie is dead. It is likely that Haskell died earlier from a heart attack, but Al is certain that if he calls the police, they will arrest him for killing Haskell. Al hides the body in the brush. He takes the dead man's money, clothes, and identification, and drives away, intent on abandoning the car near Los Angeles.

Al crosses into California and spends a night in a motel. The next day, as he leaves a gas station near Desert Center Airport, he picks up a hitchhiker, who gives her name as Vera. At first, she travels silently with Al, who has identified himself as Haskell, but suddenly challenges his identity and ownership of the car, revealing that she had been picked up by Haskell earlier in Louisiana, but got out in Arizona after he tried to force himself on her. Al tells her how Haskell died, but she blackmails him by threatening to turn him over to the police. She takes the money that Al retrieved from Haskell's wallet and demands whatever money they get by selling the car.

In Hollywood, they rent an apartment, posing as Mr. and Mrs. Haskell, to provide an address when they sell the car. When they are about to make the sale, Vera learns from a newspaper that Haskell's wealthy father is near death and a search is under way for his long-estranged son. Vera demands that Al impersonate Haskell and position himself to inherit the estate. Al refuses, arguing that the impersonation would require detailed knowledge he lacks.

Back at the apartment, Vera gets drunk and they begin arguing intensely. In a drunken rage, she threatens to call the police and runs into the bedroom with the telephone. She locks the door then falls on the bed and begins to fall asleep, the telephone cord  tangled around her neck. From the other side of door, Al pulls on the cord to try to disconnect the phone. When he breaks down the door, he discovers he has inadvertently strangled Vera. Al gives up the idea of contacting Sue again and returns to hitchhiking. He later finds out that Haskell is wanted in connection with the murder of Vera, "his wife." Back in the diner in Reno where the film opened, he imagines his inevitable arrest.

Cast

 Tom Neal as Al Roberts
 Ann Savage as Vera
 Claudia Drake as Sue Harvey
 Edmund MacDonald as Charles Haskell Jr.
 Tim Ryan as the Nevada Diner Proprietor
 Esther Howard as Holly, Diner Waitress
 Don Brodie as the Used Car Salesman
 Pat Gleason as Joe, truck driver

Production
In 1972, Ulmer said in an interview that the film was shot in six days. However, in a 2004 documentary, Ulmer's daughter Arianne presented a shooting script title page which noted, "June 14, 1945-June 29. Camera days 14." Moreover, Ann Savage was contracted to Producers Releasing Corporation (PRC) for the production of Detour for three six-day weeks, and she later said the film was shot in four six-day weeks, with an additional four days of location work in the desert at Lancaster, California.

While popular belief long held that Detour was shot for about $20,000, Noah Isenberg, in conducting research for his book on the film, discovered that the production's final cost was closer to $100,000.  Even so, it still had one of the highest profit margins, if not the highest, of any film noir listed in the National Film Registry.

Billy Halop was tested for the role of Al Roberts, was selected for the part, but was replaced by Tom Neal just three days before filming began.

Editing

As detailed in Savage Detours: The Life and Work of Ann Savage, great care was taken during the postproduction of Detour. The final picture was tightly cut down from a much longer-shooting script, which had been shot with more extended dialogue sequences than appear in the released print. The soundtrack is also fully realized, with ambient backgrounds, motivated sound effects, and a carefully scored original musical soundtrack by Leo Erdody, who had previously worked with Ulmer on Strange Illusion (1945). Erdody took extra pains to underscore Vera's introduction with a sympathetic theme, giving the character a light musical shading in contrast to her razor-sharp dialogue and its ferocious delivery by Savage.

The film was completed, negative cut, and printed throughout the late summer and fall of 1945, and was released in November of that year. The total period of preproduction through postproduction at PRC ran from March through November 1945.

In contrast, during the period Detour was in post-production, PRC shot, posted, and released Apology for Murder (1945), also starring Savage. Apology was given a shorter production period and a quick sound job, and used library music for the soundtrack. Clearly, Detour was a higher priority to PRC, and the release was well promoted in theaters with a full array of color print support, including six-sheet posters, standees, hand drawn portraits of the actors, and a jukebox tie-in record with Bing Crosby singing "I Can't Believe That You're in Love with Me" (1926).

With reshoots out of the question for such a low-budget movie, director Ulmer put storytelling above continuity. For example, he flipped the negative for some of the hitchhiking scenes. This showed the westbound New York City to Los Angeles travel of the character with a right-to-left flow across the screen, though it also made cars seem to be driving on the "wrong" side of the road, with the hitchhiker getting into the car on the driver's side.

Charlie Haskell's car

The car owned by the character Charlie Haskell and later driven by Al Roberts is itself an integral part of the film's plot and is certainly the most memorable prop item in the production. The automobile is a customized 1941 Lincoln Continental V-12 convertible, a base model of a "Cabriolet" but one that features bolted-on rear wheel-well covers and some exterior components added later from Lincoln's limited 1942 version of the same model. Reportedly, the production budget for Detour was so tight that director Ulmer decided to use this car, his "personal car", for the cross-country crime drama.

Censorship
The Motion Picture Production Code did not allow murderers to get away with their crimes, so Ulmer satisfied the censors by having Al picked up by a police car at the very end of the film after foreseeing his arrest in the earlier narration.

Reception and legacy
Detour was generally well received on its initial release, with positive reviews in the Los Angeles Times, The Hollywood Reporter, Variety in other major newspapers and trade publications. Contemporary screenings of Detour were also not confined to grindhouse theaters; they were presented at top "movie houses". For example, in downtown Los Angeles in May 1946, it played at the 2,200-seat Orpheum in combination with a live stage show featuring the hit Slim Gaillard Trio and the Buddy Rich Orchestra. Business was reported to be excellent despite a transit strike.

Shortly after the film's release in November 1945, Mandel Herbstman, the reviewer for the trade journal Motion Picture Herald, rated the production as only "fair". Herbstman was impressed, however, with the film's overall structure. "Venturing far from the familiar melodramatic pattern", he wrote, "director Edgar G. Ulmer has turned out an adroit, albeit unpretentious production about a man who stumbles into a series of circumstances which seals his doom." He especially liked its conclusion and noted, "Making no compromise with the 'happy ending' formula, the film has a number of ironic and suspenseful moments."

The film was released to television in the early 1950s, and it was broadcast in syndicated TV markets until the advent of mass cable systems. TV reviewers casually recommended it in the 1960s and 1970s as a worthwhile "B" movie. Then, by the 1980s, critics began citing Detour increasingly as a prime example of film noir, and revival houses, universities and film festivals began presenting the crime drama in tributes to Edgar G. Ulmer and his work. The director died in 1972, unfortunately before the full revival of Detour and the critical re-evaluation of his career occurred. Tom Neal died the same year as Ulmer, but Ann Savage lived long enough to experience the newfound acclaim. From 1985 until just two years before her death in 2008, she made a series of live appearances at public screenings of the film.

Critical response to the film decades after its release is almost universally positive. More current reviewers contrast the technical shoddiness of the film with its successful atmospherics as film critic Roger Ebert wrote in his essay for The Great Movies, "This movie from Hollywood's poverty row, shot in six days, filled with technical errors and ham-handed narrative, starring a man who can only pout and a woman who can only sneer, should have faded from sight soon after it was released in 1945. And yet it lives on, haunting and creepy, an embodiment of the guilty soul of film noir. No one who has seen it has easily forgotten it." Sight and Sound reviewer Philip Kemp later wrote, "Using unknown actors and filming with no more than three minimal sets, a sole exterior (a used-car lot) to represent Los Angeles, a few stock shots and some shaky back-projection, Ulmer conjures up a black, paranoid vision, totally untainted by glamour, of shabby characters trapped in a spiral of irrational guilt." Novelists Edward Gorman and Dow Mossman wrote, "Detour remains a masterpiece of its kind. There have been hundreds of better movies, but none with the feel for doom portrayed by ... Ulmer. The random universe Stephen Crane warned us about—the berserk cosmic impulse that causes earthquakes and famine and AIDS—is nowhere better depicted than in the scene where Tom Neal stands by the roadside, soaking in the midnight rain, feeling for the first time the noose drawing tighter and tighter around his neck."

In 2007, Richard Corliss, the former editor-in-chief of Film Comment and a notable film critic for Time magazine, ranked Savage's portrayal of Vera number 6 on his list of the "Top 25 Greatest Villains" in cinema history, placing her just behind Barbara Stanwyck's character Phyllis Dietrichson in Double Indemnity (1944). As part of his assessment of Vera, Corliss describes her effects on not only her traveling companion Al Roberts but on viewers of the film as well:

Remake
A remake of Detour was produced in 1992, starring Neal's son, Tom Neal Jr., and Lea Lavish, along with Susanna Foster making her first acting appearance in 43 years and her final appearance on film. Produced, written, and directed by Wade Williams and released by his distribution company, Englewood Entertainment, it was released on VHS and in 1998 on DVD.

See also
 List of films in the public domain in the United States

References

Further reading

External links

Detour essay by J. Hoberman at National Film Registry 
Detour essay by Daniel Eagan in America's Film Legacy: The Authoritative Guide to the Landmark Movies in the National Film Registry, A&C Black, 2010 , pages 386-388 

 
 
 
 
 Detour at Time Magazine All Time 100 Movies
 
 
Some Detours to Detour an essay by Robert Polito at the Criterion Collection

1945 films
1945 crime drama films
American crime drama films
American black-and-white films
1940s English-language films
Film noir
Films about automobiles
Films based on American novels
Films directed by Edgar G. Ulmer
American drama road movies
United States National Film Registry films
Films about hitchhiking
Articles containing video clips
Films based on crime novels
1940s drama road movies
Films shot in Los Angeles County, California
1940s American films
1940s independent films
American independent films